Acrobasis sodalella is a moth of the family Pyralidae. It was described by Philipp Christoph Zeller in 1848 and is found in Europe.

The moth flies in one generation from June to July.

The larvae feed on oak.

Notes 

Moths described in 1848
Acrobasis
Moths of Europe